The  mixed individual BC2 boccia event at the 2016 Summer Paralympics was contested from 13 September to 16 September at Sambodromo in Rio de Janeiro. 24 competitors took part.

The event structure was amended from the 2012 event, with the final eight drawn from group stages. The top players from each of eight pools of three entered into a quarter final single elimination stage, with the losing semifinalists playing off for bronze.

Watcharaphon Vongsa of Thailand defeat compatriot Worawut Saengampa 5-4 in the final match to win the gold medal, the sixth for Thailand at the 2016 Games. In doing so, it ensured the 2016 Paralympic Games were the most successful enjoyed by Thailand since it first entered in 1984

Elimination rounds

Pool stages

Pool A

Pool B

Pool C

Pool D

Pool E

Pool F

Pool G

Pool H

References

Individual BC2